Anne-Sophie Avé (10 November 1968) is a French diplomat. From September 2018 to August 2022, she was the Ambassador of France to Ghana. From 2019 to 2021, she hosted a TV talk show in Ghana called 'Touch of France'.

She got involved in music industry connecting French artists Passi and Orti to Ghanaian musicians Sarkodie, Stonebwoy, Kwabena Kwabena, Becca, Fameye, Akwaboah and Gasmilla. She went ahead to organize PARIS IN ACCRA concert in November 2021 and the return leg ACCRA IN PARIS on 23 April 2022 Her impact on Ghanaian music industry was appraised by the entire industry 

Her positive impact on the youth of Ghana has been lauded profusely in the press and on social media  for her closeness to people 

She has changed the face of diplomacy  endeared herself in the hearts of Ghanaians 

She is the most followed ambassador on Instagram on her handle @as.ave.

She is the founder of The Akosua Fund a donor advised fund hosted by reputable international NGO OAfrica. The fund aims at supporting projects for the children and youth of the communities where she has been made a Queen mother

On 31 August 2022, she was appointed Ambassador for public Diplomacy in Africa  by the French president Emmanuel Macron

Even after she ended her tour of duty in Ghana she remained closely linked to the country and often interacts with Ghanaians online

Early life and education 
She was born in Fontainebleau to a father who was a director of a record company and a mother who was a teacher.

She grew up in Belgium and attended Lycée Français in Brussels. Anne Sophie Avé graduated from Toulouse Business School in 1991 and attended Ecole Nationale d’administration from 2003 to 2005.

Honors and awards 
She was enstooled in May 2020 as the Nkosuahemaa of Hani in the Tain District in the Bono Region (Ghana) with the stool name Nana Benneh III.  In June 2022, she was enskinned the queen mother of Bonobutu under the chieftaincy name Napoka Amaltinga Apoka. In August 2022, she was enstooled a Queen mother of Osu under the stool name Naa Norley Owaa Oman.

Awards 
 French National order of Merit Chevalier de l’ONM (30 January 2008)
 Knight of the Légion of Honneur (30 December 2016)
 Diplomat of the Year 2021 
 Ambassador of the Year (Youth Excellence Awards 2021)
 100 most influential change makers in Ghana
Discovery of the Year - 2021 Ghana Movie Awards
TV Show of the Year (Ghana Media and Entrepreneurship Awards 2021)
Woman of the year 2022 (Golden Age Creative Arts Awards 22)
Most outstanding female change maker (Humanitarian awards global 2022)

Criticism 

On August 12, 2022, Avé's Twitter account was restricted to followers, after public criticism of a Twitter post regarding France's and, by extension, her responsibility for the enslavement of African peoples during the colonial period arose. Four days earlier, Avé had posted that "slavery is a crime against humanity, and indeed some people bought slaves but some sold them. And they were not Europeans ... if you want to blame, blame all". The Tweet was a reaction to criticism of neocolonialism referring to Avé's installation as a developmental queen of Osu. The Tweet has been deleted as of August 16, 2022.

Touch Of  France 
A TV talk show hosted by Anne-Sophie Avé stars notable persons in Ghana and showcases France and its culture. The show was awarded "TV show of the year” at Ghana Media and Entrepreneurship Awards ceremony.

See also 

 Lists of ambassadors of France
 Touch Of France (Replays sur Youtube)

References 

Living people
Ambassadors of France to Ghana
French women ambassadors
1968 births
Toulouse Business School alumni
École nationale d'administration alumni
People from Fontainebleau